Haplochromis greenwoodi is a species of cichlid endemic to Lake Victoria where they are found in the southeastern portion of the lake.  Its preferred habitat consists of areas with rocky substrates.  This species can reach a length of  SL. The specific name honours the British ichthyologist Humphry Greenwood (1927-1995) for his contribution to the knowledge of the systematics of the Lake Victoria cichlids. This species is placed in the genus Neochromis by some authorities.

References

greenwoodi
Fish of Tanzania
Fish of Lake Victoria
Fish described in 1998
Taxonomy articles created by Polbot